Predrag Finci (born 5 August 1946) is a Bosnian–British philosopher, author, and essayist.

Biography 
Predrag Finci started his career as an actor. In 1968 Finci played the role of Gavrilo Princip in the film Sarajevski atentat directed by Fadil Hadžić. Later he studied philosophy at the University of Sarajevo and at the University of Paris X: Nanterre under Mikel Dufrenne. He was a visiting researcher at the Freiburg University under the supervision of Werner Marx. He completed his MA in 1977 and PhD in philosophy in 1981. He was a professor of aesthetics at the University of Sarajevo until 1993 when, during the Bosnian war, he left Sarajevo for London. He has lived there since, and worked as a freelance interpreter and writer until his retirement in 2011.

Work 
Finci's work is based on a combination of erudition, philosophical and aesthetical insights, and personal experience.
Finci writes extensively in his native language and also in English. Reviews of Finci's books have been published in Bosnia, Croatia, and Serbia. He was an honorary visiting fellow at University College London from 1999 to 2013. 
Predrag Finci is a member of Exiled Writers Ink! in London. He is a founder-member of Bosnian P.E.N. He is a member of the Croatian Philosophical Society. He received the Svjetlost Publisher Award in 1980 and the Veselin Maslesa Publisher Award in 1986. In 2011 he received the Science Award for his book Imaginacija (Imagination) at the 23rd International Book Fair, Sarajevo.

Bibliography

In English:
 Applause, and then Silence, with an Introduction by Moris Farhi, Style Writers Now, 2012, 
 Why I Killed Franz Ferdinand and Other Essays, with an Introduction by Cathi Unsworth, Style Writers Now, 2014, 

Published in Bosnia:
 Govor prepiski (Discourse of Correspondence), Svjetlost, Sarajevo, 1980, 
 Umjetnost i iskustvo egzistencije (Art and Experience of Existence), Svjetlost, Sarajevo, 1986, 
 Ishodište pitanja (The Source of Question), Glas, Banja Luka, 1987, OCLC 23869495
 O nekim sporednim stvarima (On Some Secondary Matters), Veselin Maslesa, Sarajevo,1990,
 Sarajevski zapisi (Sarajevo's Notes), Buybook, Sarajevo 2004,  
 Poetozofski eseji (Poetosophic Essays), Medjunarodni centar za mir, Sarajevo, 2004,  
 O kolodvoru i putniku (About Stations and Travellers), Motrišta, Mostar, 2013, ISSN 1512-5475; IK Rabic, Sarajevo 2015,  Translated into Hebrew and published by Carmelph.co.il, 2019    Translated into Italian and published in Italy La stazione e il viaggiatore, Ass. Culturale Il Foglio, 2022 
 Kratka, a tužna povijest uma (A Short But Sad History of Mind), IKB Rabic, Sarajevo, 2016.  COBIS: BH-ID 22956550
 Elektronička špilja (The Electronic Cave), Art Rabic, Sarajevo, 2017.    COBISS.BH.ID 23983110
 O književnosti i piscima (Of Literature and Writers), Art Rabic, Sarajevo, 2018. 
 Zapisi veselog filozofa. Slikovni zapisi u knjizi: Amela Hadžimejlić, (Notes of the Merry Philosopher. Visual comments by Amela Hadžimejlić), Art Rabic, Sarajevo 2019.
 Prošle godine u Barnetu (Last year in Barnet), Buybook, Sarajevo 2022. ISBN 9789958306747

Published in Croatia:
 Umjetnost uništenog: estetika, rat i Holokaust (The Arts of the Destroyed. The Arts, the War and the Holocaust), Izdanja Antibarbarus, Zagreb, 2005,  
 Priroda umjetnosti (The Nature of the Arts), Izdanja Antibarbarus, Zagreb, 2006, 
 Tekst o tuđini (The Text on Exile) illustrated by Mersad Berber, Demetra, Zagreb, 2007         Translated into Italian and published in Italy Il popolo del diluvio, Bottega Errante Edizioni, 2018 
 Djelo i nedjelo: umjetnost, etika i politika (On the Arts, Ethics and Politics), Demetra, Zagreb, 2008,                      
 Imaginacija (Imagination), Zagreb, Izdanja Antibarbarus, 2009,         
 Osobno kao tekst, (Personal as Text), Izdanja Antibarbarus, Zagreb, 2011, 
 Čitatelj Hegelove estetike (A Reader of Hegel's Aesthetics), Naklada Breza, Zagreb, 2014, 
 Estetska terminologija (Terminology of Aesthetics), Izdanja Antibarbarus, Zagreb, 2014, 
 Korist filozofije (Usefulness of Philosophy), Izdanja Antibarbarus, Zagreb, 2017, 
 Što se sviđa svima. Komentari uz Kantovo shvaćanje umjetnosti(What is Pleasing to All. Comments on Kant's Conception of the Arts), Biblioteka Filozofska istraživanja, knjiga 152, Zagreb 2019.  
 Prvo, bitno (Prime, Essential), Factum izdavaštvo Belgrade and Jesenski and Turk Zagreb 2020. 
 Sve dok (Until), Fraktura, Zapresic, 2021 
 U unutarnjem, istina (In the Innter, the Truth), TIM press, Zagreb 2022., ISBN 9789533690094
Published in Serbia:
 Ukratko (In Short), Factum Izdavastvo, Belgrade, 2018, 
 Misterij, iza svega(Mystery Beyond Everything), Factum Izdavastvo, Belgrade, 2019 
 Prvo, bitno (Prime, Essential) Factum izdavaštvo Belgrade and Jesenski and Turk Zagreb 2020. 
 Emigrantska slikovnica (An Immigrant Picture Book''), U suradnji Factum izdavaštvo, Beograd i Jesenski i Turk, Zagreb 2022. ISBN 9788680254494

References

Sources
 Interview with Predrag Finci 2012 
 Interview with Predrag Finci, 2012 
 Predrag Finci about Exile, 2012 
 Interview with Predrag Finci 2013 
 BBC Radio 3, A Conversation with Predrag Finci 2014
 www.smashwords.com, Interview with Predrag Finci, 2014

External links
 Exiled Writers Inc! 
 P. E. N. Bosnia and Herzegovina 
 El Mundo Sefarad 
  Smrt čitatelja(The Death of the Reader) by Predrag Finci, 2005 
 Il libro dell'esilio (The Text on Exile) translated by Angelo Floramo, 2007 
 The Terrorism of the Cultural Column by Predrag Finci 
 Antisemitizam u umjetnosti (Antisemitism in Art), a series of texts by Predrag Finci, 2013 
 O kolodvoru i putniku (About Stations and Travelers) by Predrag Finci, pages 87–144, 2013 
 O nekim sporednim stvarima (On some Secondary Matters) by Predrag Finci 
 Hrvatska Enciklopedija 

1946 births
Living people
Writers from Sarajevo
20th-century philosophers
21st-century philosophers
Continental philosophers
Yugoslav essayists
Bosnia and Herzegovina male writers
Male essayists
Bosnia and Herzegovina philosophers
University of Sarajevo alumni
University of Paris alumni
Philosophers of art
20th-century essayists
21st-century essayists
20th-century male writers
21st-century male writers
Bosnia and Herzegovina expatriates in England
Bosnia and Herzegovina writers
Bosnia and Herzegovina essayists
Writers from London
British philosophers
Jewish Bosnian writers